5am is the debut studio album by the English band Amber Run, released on 20 April 2015 through RCA Victor.
It was produced by Mike Crossey at Livingston Studios in London in January 2014.

The album includes the singles "I Found", "Spark", "Just My Soul Responding" and a re-recorded version of "Noah". To support the release, the band embarked on a 2015 UK/European tour.
Upon release, 5am reached number 36 on the UK Albums Chart.

Track listing

Charts

References

2015 debut albums
Amber Run albums